Bruno Alicarte (born 18 January 1972) is a French former professional football defender.

Born in Perpignan, he played for Montpellier HSC, SC Bastia, Deportivo Alavés, Neuchâtel Xamax, Naval 1º de Maio and Stade Lavallois.

Bruno's younger brother is Hervé Alicarte.

References

External links
 
 

1972 births
Living people
Sportspeople from Perpignan
Association football defenders
Footballers from Occitania (administrative region)
French footballers
Montpellier HSC players
SC Bastia players
Deportivo Alavés players
Neuchâtel Xamax FCS players
Associação Naval 1º de Maio players
Stade Lavallois players
Ligue 1 players
Ligue 2 players
Swiss Super League players
French expatriate footballers
Expatriate footballers in Spain
French expatriate sportspeople in Spain
Expatriate footballers in Switzerland
French expatriate sportspeople in Switzerland
Expatriate footballers in Portugal
French expatriate sportspeople in Portugal